Mstislaw or Mstislavl is a town in Mogilev Region, Belarus. It serves as the administrative center of Mstsislaw District. As of 2009, its population was 10,804.

History
Mstislavl was first mentioned in the Ipatiev Chronicle in 1156. It was initially a part of the Principality of Smolensk, but had become the capital of the Principality of Mstislavl by 1180. In the Middle Ages, it was the seat of the Mstislavsky princely family. Pyotr Mstislavets is believed to have been born in Mstislavl.

In 1377, it was joined to the Grand Duchy of Lithuania by own free will. The first Lithuanian duke of Mstislavl was Karigaila, brother of Jogaila. The town remained part of the Polish–Lithuanian Commonwealth under the Mścisław Voivodship until the Partitions of Poland in 1772. 

Buildings of historic interest include the Carmelite church (1637, renovated 1746–50) and the Jesuit cathedral (1640, renovated 1730–38, turned into an Orthodox cathedral in 1842).

Jews had a historic presence in the town. In 1939, there were 2,067 Jews living in Mstislavl which represented almost 20% of the local population. The German army occupied the town in July 1941. In early October, they killed 30 elderly Jews. On October 15, 1941, together with the local police, they murdered from 850 to 1,300 Jews.

It is the birthplace of Jewish historian and writer Simon Dubnow, Jewish statesman and Communist politician Yakov Chubin, and expressionist artist Abraham A. Manievich, among others.

References

External links 

 Photos on Radzima.org
 The murder of the Jews of Mstsislaw during World War II, at Yad Vashem website.

Towns in Belarus
Populated places in Mogilev Region
Mstsislaw District
Mstislaw Voivodeship
Mstislavsky Uyezd